Paul Richard Epworth (born 25 July 1974) is an English record producer, songwriter, musician, and remixer. He has worked with artists including Adele, Florence and the Machine, Rihanna, and Maxïmo Park, among many others. He is a member of the Music Producers Guild and is the founder and owner of the independent record label Wolf Tone, which has released music from Glass Animals, Rosie Lowe, and The Horrors.

Epworth has won the Brit Award for British Producer of the Year three times, the most recent in 2015. He has won seven Grammy Awards, as well as the Academy Award for Best Original Song for "Skyfall". He released his debut studio album Voyager in 2020.

Early life
Paul Richard Epworth was born in Bishop's Stortford, Hertfordshire, on 25 July 1974.

Career

Lomax
From 2002 to 2004, Epworth provided lead vocals and guitar for the band Lomax. He later remixed two songs from the band's catalogue – "Reiterator" and "Modern Life".

Remixing
Epworth is well known for his remix work under the name "Phones". He began to gain recognition with this moniker based on his work with Bloc Party's track "Banquet"; he has since provided remix work for New Order, U2, P-Diddy, Goldfrapp, Nine Inch Nails, Simian Mobile Disco, The Streets, Interpol, Tom Vek, Death from Above 1979, Annie and Coldplay. His debut of original material under the Phones name, "Sharpen the Knives"/"Worryin", was released on French label Kitsuné in November 2006. In 2008 he announced he had stopped using the Phones name but has said he continues to remix anonymously.

In early 2006, Epworth began making music under another alias, 'Epic Man'. His debut single, "More Is Enough", featured Plan B and was featured on the soundtrack for Need For Speed: Pro Street and was released on Good & Evil Records, a subsidiary of 679 Recordings. He has since returned to his Phones name and there are no known plans to release under Epic Man again.

Production and writing
In 2004–05, Epworth produced four critically acclaimed releases, including two Mercury Music Prize nominations in Silent Alarm by Bloc Party and A Certain Trigger by Maxïmo Park, the bulk of The Futureheads eponymous debut (including the hit Kate Bush cover "Hounds Of Love"), and Capture/Release by The Rakes as well as singles by Babyshambles and The Long Blondes. He also wrote and produced tracks for British rappers, Kano ("Don't Know Why") and Plan B ("No Good" and "Where You From") This was followed in 2006 by production work on Pieces of the People We Love by The Rapture and the debut album by French band Black Strobe, entitled Burn Your Own Church.

In 2007, Epworth began to contribute more co-writing credits alongside his production. For example, his production on the number one debut album Made of Bricks by Kate Nash included a writing credit on the hit single "Foundations" (for which he was nominated for an Ivor Novello songwriters award.) In 2008, Epworth produced much of Sam Sparro's eponymous debut album which entered the UK album charts at number 4 and the Primal Scream single, "Can't Go Back", along with the title track of their recent album Beautiful Future. Epworth also completed production duties on much of the new Bloc Party record, Intimacy and co-wrote and produced Friendly Fires track "Jump In The Pool".

Early 2009 saw Epworth co-writing and recording Jack Peñate's critically lauded second album Everything Is New including the singles "Tonight's Today" and "Be the One". He also co-wrote and produced tracks for Florence and the Machine's debut album Lungs, including the hit single "Rabbit Heart (Raise It Up)" along with the album tracks "Howl", "Cosmic Love", "Hurricane Drunk" and "Blinding". He also worked further with Friendly Fires on a single version of the track "Skeleton Boy" and produced the forthcoming single by The Big Pink, "Stop the World". In February 2009 he won best newcomer at the inaugural Music Producers' Guild Awards. In Spring 2009, Epworth co-produced another single with The Big Pink entitled "Dominos", and a new Friendly Fires single "Kiss of Life".

Summer 2009 brought Epworth his third and fourth Mercury music prize nomination in the shape of Florence and the Machine's Lungs and Friendly Fires' eponymous debut. He also finished album tracks for Norwegian pop artist Annie for her delayed album Don't Stop; wrote the "Zingolo" for Cadbury's "Fair Trade" advert, featuring Ghanaian MC Tinny; and mixed the track "Silva & Grimes" for Holy Fuck's Latin lp. He finished up the year working on new tracks by London MC/Singer Plan B for his number 1 album The Defamation Of Strickland Banks including the top 10 single "Stay Too Long", and tracks for Canadian duo Crystal Castles (including single Celestica), writing with Grammy winner Adele, singer Sky Ferreira and producing a single version of album track "Tonight" with The Big Pink.

In February 2010, Epworth won both the Brit Award and the Music Producers' Guild Award for Producer Of The Year and also won Music Week's Producer of the Year Award in April.

Early 2010 saw Epworth deliver tracks for London band Chapel Club's forthcoming LP and begin work on both Friendly Fires' and Florence and the Machine's second LPs. He also signed a solo deal with Columbia Records, with no album forthcoming until 2019. Epworth added his production hand to Primary 1's album, including lead single "Princess". Summer 2010 saw him provide production on two versions of Cee Lo Green's cover of Band of Horses' "No One's Gonna Love You", and for the single "It's OK".

Late 2010 and early 2011 saw the release of the acclaimed Epworth co-written and produced worldwide number one single "Rolling in the Deep" from Adele's 21. The album features three Epworth co-writes with Adele, which he produced "I'll Be Waiting", while "He Won't Go" was produced by Rick Rubin. Summer 2011 saw Epworth producing The Big Pink's  Future This and the critically acclaimed Ceremonials by Florence and the Machine.

On 12 February 2012 at the 54th Grammy Awards, he won four Grammy Awards for Producer of the Year, Album of the Year (Adele's 21), and Song of the Year and Record of the Year (for "Rolling in the Deep"). Later that year, Epworth founded the independent record label Wolf Tone. One of the first acts signed to the label was Glass Animals. Wolf Tone would later sign artists including Rosie Lowe, The Horrors, Plaitum, Elle Watson, Art School Girlfriend, Harry Edwards, Lunch Money Life, and AV Dummy.

In 2013, Epworth and Adele received the Golden Globe Award for Best Original Song at the 70th Golden Globe Awards for the song "Skyfall".  Epworth and Adele also received the Academy Award for Best Original Song at the 85th Academy Awards for "Skyfall".

In late 2015, Adele released her third album 25, which features two tracks co-written and produced by Epworth, "I Miss You" and "Sweetest Devotion". 25 won for Album of the Year at the 59th Grammy Awards.

In 2016, Epworth produced two tracks for The Stone Roses, "All for One" and "Beautiful Thing", which he also mixed. He served as executive producer on the Glass Animals album How to Be a Human Being, which was released by Wolf Tone. Paul also co-wrote and produced the Usher track "Chains" featuring Nas and Bibi Bourelly.

On 30 August 2019, he released the first track from a new project to be released via Columbia Records.

In September 2020, Epworth released his debut studio album Voyager. Voyager draws on Epworth's love of house and cosmic disco, influenced by and channelled through a heavy filter of 70s sci fi. In the same month, Epworth gave an interview to NME in which he talks extensively about his long-standing working relationship with Adele.

The Church Studios
In October 2013, Epworth bought The Church Studios, a recording studio in the Crouch End area of London. The studio had previously been owned by David A. Stewart in the 1980s and 1990s, and was used to record music by Eurythmics, Bob Dylan and Radiohead, among others. David Gray then owned the studio until Epworth took over in 2013. The Church studios has three working commercial studios, all refurbished by the Walters-Storyk Design Group and Miloco builds. Epworth had a 72-Channel Vintage EMI Neve Console installed in studio 1, and a Solid State Logic console installed in studio 2. Since Epworth's ownership of the Church Studios, notable artists such as Mumford and Sons, U2, Adele, Frank Ocean, and London Grammar have recorded there.

Discography

Studio albums
 Voyager (2020)

Singles

(as Phones)
 2006: "Sharpen the Knives / Worryin'"

(as Epic Man)
 2006: "More Is Enough" (feat. Plan B)

(as Paul Epworth)
 2019: "Voyager" b/w "Voyager 2" (feat. Matty)
 2020: "Love Galaxy" (feat. Jay Electronica, Lil Silva, and Dave Bayley)

Songwriting and production credits

Remixes

 2004 Bloc Party – "Banquet"
 2004 Annie – "Heartbeat"
 2004 Death from Above 1979 – "Romantic Rights"
 2004 The Futureheads – "Decent Days and Nights"
 2004 The Streets – "Fit But You Know It"
 2004 The Futureheads – "Hounds of Love"
 2005 Gang of Four – "Not Great Men"
 2005 Goldfrapp – "Ooh La La"
 2005 The Kills – "Love Is a Deserter"
 2005 New Order – "Krafty"
 2005 The Killers – "Smile Like You Mean It"
 2005 The Others – "This Is for the Poor"
 2005 The Rakes – "Retreat"
 2005 Tom Vek – "I Ain't Saying My Goodbyes"
 2005 Tom Vek – "Nothing But Green Lights"
 2005 White Rose Movement – "Alsatian"
 2005 U2 – "City of Blinding Lights"
 2006 Black Strobe – "Shining Bright Star"
 2006 Bloc Party – "The Prayer"
 2006 Muse – "Supermassive Black Hole"
 2006 Wolf & Cub – "Thousand Cuts"
 2007 Peter Bjorn and John feat. Victoria Bergsman – "Young Folks"
 2007 Diddy – "Tell Me"
 2007 New Young Pony Club – "The Bomb"
 2007 Nine Inch Nails – "Capital G"
 2007 Roxy Music – "Editions of You"
 2007 Interpol – "The Heinrich Maneuver"
 2007 Dead Soul Bros – "Come On Now"
 2008 Pin Me Down – "Cryptic"
 2008 Jape – I Was A Man
 2008 The Black Ghosts – "Repetition Kills You"
 2008 Friendly Fires – "Skeleton Boy"
 2008 Bloc Party – "Talons"
 2008 Santigold – "Say Aha"
 2013 U2 - "Ordinary Love"
 2014 Coldplay - "Midnight"

Awards and nominations

References

External links
 
 

English record producers
English songwriters
Living people
Grammy Award winners
Golden Globe Award-winning musicians
Brit Award winners
Best Original Song Academy Award-winning songwriters
1974 births
Kitsuné artists
People from Bishop's Stortford
People educated at Newport Free Grammar School
Musicians from Hertfordshire